Canada and the United States have faced each other in the gold medal game of six of seven Olympics, 20 of 21 IIHF Women's World Championships and 21 of 23 4 Nations Cups since the beginning of international play. Only a few of Canada's and the U.S.'s losses have been to teams outside their rivalry. Canada currently leads the head-to-head with 93 Canadian wins vs 73 American wins.

History
After an American victory over Canada at the 1998 Nagano Olympics, the Canadian Olympic team won the next four gold medals over the USA (the exception being 2006 where Canada defeated Sweden for gold and USA defeated Finland for bronze) until 2018, when the USA ended a 20-year gold medal drought defeating Canada in a shootout. Canada once again claimed Olympic gold over the USA at the 2022 Olympics.

However, at the World Championships, Canada won the first 8 straight gold medals from 1990 to 2004 but since, the USA has dominated winning 9 of the last 13 World Championships, defeating Canada eight times (the exception being 2019 where the USA won gold defeating Finland, who upset Canada in their semi-final match). 

At the 4 Nations Cup, Canada and the USA have faced each other in every gold medal game (except 2001 when the USA withdrew due to the September 11 attacks and 2013 where Canada won gold defeating Finland and the USA won bronze defeating Sweden), with Canada winning 10 of the first 13 and the USA winning 6 of the last 10.

The longest win streak, eight games, by the Americans was broken by Canada's win in the gold medal game of the 2002 Olympics.

Head to Head Record

Overall 
Canada Regulation Wins 72 + Overtime Wins 15 + Shootout Wins 6 = 93USA Regulation Wins 55 + Overtime Wins 8 + Shootout Wins 10 = 73
1 Tie

Gold Medal Games 
Canada 
Regulation Wins 21 + Overtime Wins 7 + Shootout Wins 2 = 30
USA 
Regulation Wins 11 + Overtime Wins 4 + Shootout Wins 5 = 20

Game Results

Results of Tournaments

Medal Tables 

Olympics 
Accurate as of 2022 Winter Olympics.

IIHF World Women's Championships 
Accurate as of 2022 IIHF Women's World Championship.

Four Nations Cup 
Accurate as of 2018 4 Nations Cup.

References

Canada–United States relations in popular culture
Ice hockey rivalries
Sports rivalries in Canada
Sports rivalries in the United States
Rivalry in women's sports
International sports rivalries